The women's shot put event at the 2008 World Junior Championships in Athletics was held in Bydgoszcz, Poland, at Zawisza Stadium on 9 and 10 July.

Medalists

Results

Final
10 July

Qualifications
9 July

Group A

Group B

Participation
According to an unofficial count, 25 athletes from 19 countries participated in the event.

References

Shot put
Shot put at the World Athletics U20 Championships
2008 in women's athletics